The 2013 European Rally Championship season was the 61st season of the FIA European Rally Championship, the European continental championship series in rallying. The season was also the first following the merger between the European Rally Championship and the Intercontinental Rally Challenge. French broadcaster Eurosport, which previously organised the IRC, assumed the duties of organising the ERC.

The season started in Austria on 3 January, with the running of the Internationale Jänner Rallye, and finished on 9 November at the International Rallye du Valais. Jan Kopecký won the Championship after scoring a total of six victories and two more podium finishes.

Calendar
The calendar for the 2013 season featured twelve rallies, which were drawn from the 2012 European Rally Championship and Intercontinental Rally Challenge calendars. A final calendar of thirteen events was confirmed on 15 December 2012, however in April 2013 Rally San Marino lost its place on the calendar.

Selected entries
The following teams and drivers represent the major entries participating in the 2013 season:

Ladies Trophy

Results

Championship standings

Drivers' Championship
 For the drivers' championship, only the best four results from the first six rallies and the best four results from the remaining six rallies could be retained by each driver. Points are awarded on a 25–18–15–12–10–8–6–4–2–1 scale, with bonus points awarded on a 7–6–5–4–3–2–1 scale, to the top seven drivers on each leg of a rally, provided the leg covers at least 25% of the total rally length.

References

External links
 Official website

 
European Rally Championship
Rally Championship
European Rally Championship seasons